Talus MB-4H is a four-wheel-drive launch tractor which was specifically designed for the RNLI, to launch and recover inshore lifeboats from beach launched lifeboat stations. The tractor is produced by the British company of Clayton Engineering Limited who are based in Knighton, Powys. The tractor plays an important role within the operations required for saving lives at sea.

RNLI Talus MB-4H Fleet

See also 
 Talus MB-H Launch tractor
 Talus MB-764 Launch tractor
 TC45 launch tractor
 Talus Atlantic 85 DO-DO launch carriage

References 

Royal National Lifeboat Institution launch vehicles
Sea-going tractors
Tractors
Rescue equipment